Margaret Osla Henniker-Major, Lady Henniker-Major (née Benning; 23 August 1921 – 29 October 1974) was a Canadian debutante, who worked at Bletchley Park, was Prince Philip's first girlfriend, and later married John Henniker-Major (later 8th Baron Henniker).

Early life
Osla Benning was born in Montreal, Quebec, Canada, on 23 August 1921, the daughter of Edith Black and James William Benning, and the goddaughter of Lord Louis Mountbatten. She went to finishing school in Austria, and came out as a debutante in August 1939.

World War II, Prince Philip and Bletchley Park

Benning went to stay with her godfather Lord Mountbatten, who mentioned to her friend (and fellow god-daughter) Sarah Baring that Prince Philip (Mountbatten's nephew) did not have a girlfriend and Baring acted as matchmaker. According to Baring, "It was obvious that he was Osla's boyfriend in a simple, nice way, so to speak". "I do know that he was her first love," says her daughter, Janie Spring. "She never told me about him for years. She just said: 'I fell in love with a naval officer.’"

Early in the war, she and Baring went to build Hurricane fighter planes at a Hawker Siddeley factory close to Slough, and shared a cottage nearby.

A few months later, by summer 1941, they were both tested on their German language skills and posted to Hut 4 at Bletchley Park, the naval section, as linguists.

Kate Quinn’s 2021 novel about Bletchley Park, The Rose Code, features a character named Osla Kendall, who is based heavily on Osla Benning.

Personal life
In 1946 she married John Henniker-Major, 8th Baron Henniker.  They had two sons and one daughter:
Mark Ian Philip Chandos Henniker-Major, 9th Baron Henniker (born 29 September 1947), married Lesley Antoinette Foskett
Hon. Charles John Giles Henniker-Major (2 September 1949 – 9 May 2012), married Sally Kemp Newby
Hon. Jane Elizabeth Henniker-Major (born 6 July 1954).

Her husband was knighted in the 1965 New Years Honours List and succeeded as the 8th Baron Henniker in 1980.

Death
Benning died of cancer in Kensington, London, on 29 October 1974, at the age of 53.

References

1921 births
1974 deaths
Bletchley Park women
Canadian emigrants to the United Kingdom
People from Montreal
Debutantes
Canadian socialites
Wives of knights
Hartismere
Henniker
Bletchley Park people